Alcoa Premiere (also known as Premiere, Presented by Fred Astaire) is an American anthology drama series that aired from October 1961 to July 1963 on ABC. The series was hosted by Fred Astaire, who also starred in several of the episodes.

Overview
Each episode presented a new story, with no overriding theme to the series as a whole.  While some episodes were light entertainment, and at least one variety show was aired, the dramatic episodes often offered powerful stories on painful or controversial subjects as opposed to classic drama. The series showcased writers such as Ray Bradbury, Howard Rodman, Ernest Kinoy, Donald S. Sanford, Alfred Bester, and Gene L. Coon, amongst others.  The program also featured actors such as James Stewart, John Wayne, Charlton Heston, James Whitmore, Maureen O'Sullivan, Arthur Kennedy and Ray Milland.  Both Stewart and Wayne appeared in an episode directed by John Ford.

The premiere telecast was "People Need People" about the rehabilitation of psychologically disturbed war veterans starring Lee Marvin and Arthur Kennedy and directed by Alex Segal.

Several Alcoa Premiere episodes were actually pilots for TV shows, often produced by other hands and picked up as anthology episodes by Alcoa.  Most of these pilots went no further than their appearance on Alcoa Premiere, but two series (Channing and McHale's Navy) were developed from the pilot films shown on this anthology series.

One first-season episode ("The Jail") had been produced with the intention of airing as an episode of Alfred Hitchcock Presents, but was shown on Alcoa Premiere instead.  The episode was written by Ray Bradbury and produced by the AHP crew, with Hitchcock credited as executive producer of the aired episode.

Broadcast history
During its first season, the show was broadcast on Tuesday evenings at 10:00 pm.  The show moved to Thursday evenings at the same time for its second season.

Awards
The anthology was nominated for 14 Emmy Awards during its two-year run.

Episodes

Season 1 (1961–62)

Season 2 (1962–63)

See also
 The Alcoa Hour

References

External links 
  
 Alcoa Premiere at CVTA with episode link

1961 American television series debuts
1963 American television series endings
1960s American anthology television series
American Broadcasting Company original programming
1960s American drama television series
Black-and-white American television shows
English-language television shows
Television series by Universal Television
Alcoa